The 1972–73 Memphis State Tigers men's basketball team represented Memphis State University as a member of the Missouri Valley Conference during the 1972–73 men's college basketball season. The team was led by third-year head coach Gene Bartow and played their home games at Mid-South Coliseum in Memphis, Tennessee.

As MVC champions, the Tigers participated in the 1973 NCAA Tournament. They defeated South Carolina and Kansas State to reach the first Final Four in program history. After a win over Providence to reach the national championship game, Memphis State was defeated by unbeaten, 6-time defending National champion UCLA, 87–66. The team finished with a 24–6 record (12–2 MVC).

Roster

Schedule and results

|-
!colspan=9 style= | Regular season

|-
!colspan=9 style= | NCAA Tournament

Rankings

Awards and honors
Larry Kenon – Missouri Valley Conference Player of the Year

NBA Draft

References

Memphis Tigers men's basketball seasons
1972 in sports in Tennessee
1973 in sports in Tennessee
Memphis State
NCAA Division I men's basketball tournament Final Four seasons
Memphis State